This is a list of municipalities in Jordan which have standing links to local communities in other countries known as "town twinning" (usually in Europe) or "sister cities" (usually in the rest of the world).

A
Amman

 Ankara, Turkey
 Astana, Kazakhstan
 Bucharest, Romania
 Cairo, Egypt
 Chicago, United States
 Cincinnati, United States
 Hebron, Palestine
 Islamabad, Pakistan
 Istanbul, Turkey
 Mostar, Bosnia and Herzegovina
 Paphos, Cyprus
 San Francisco, United States
 Sofia, Bulgaria
 Tunis, Tunisia
 Yerevan, Armenia

Aqaba

 Alcamo, Italy
 Hammamet, Tunisia
 Saint Petersburg, Russia
 Sharm El-Sheikh, Egypt
 Ürümqi, China
 Varna, Bulgaria

D
Deir Alla
 Gainesville, United States

I
Irbid

 Gaziantep, Turkey
 Zhengzhou, China

J
Jerash

 Huedin, Romania
 Orăștie, Romania
 Sliven, Bulgaria

K
Al-Karak

 Birmingham, United States
 Veliko Tarnovo, Bulgaria

M
Madaba

 Cherkasy, Ukraine
 Tundzha, Bulgaria

P
Petra

 Agra, India
 Matera, Italy
 Plovdiv, Bulgaria

S
Al-Salt

 Inđija, Serbia
 Pazardzhik, Bulgaria

Al-Shuna al-Shamalyah
 Jericho, Palestine

Z
Zarqa
 Oran, Algeria

References

Jordan
Jordan geography-related lists
Populated places in Jordan
Foreign relations of Jordan